Bryan Thomas (born 26 December 1961) is an Australian sprint canoeist who competed in the late 1980s. He finished fourth in the K-4 1000 m event at the 1988 Summer Olympics in Seoul.

References
Sports-reference.com profile

1961 births
Australian male canoeists
Canoeists at the 1988 Summer Olympics
Living people
Olympic canoeists of Australia
People educated at St Patrick's College, Ballarat